The 2009–10 Djurgårdens IF Hockey season was the club's 34th season in the Swedish elite league Elitserien. Hardy Nilsson returned to Djurgården as head coach on March 2, 2009. Nilsson previously coached Djurgården during the 1999–2000 and the 2000–01 seasons. The club became Swedish champions during both of these seasons. Djurgården lost last season's scoring leader when Fredrik Bremberg moved to Atlant Moscow Oblast. The team was later reinforced by former NHL and Djurgården player Marcus Nilson. Marcus Ragnarsson replaced Jimmie Ölvestad as team captain on August 7, 2009. The regular season started on away ice on September 24, 2009 against HV71 and was concluded on March 13, 2010 away against Frölunda HC. Djurgården reached the final in the playoff rounds, where the team lost 4–2 in games against HV71.

Pre-season 
Djurgården began the pre-season playing in the 2009 Nordic Trophy tournament, a total of five games plus two playoff games, from August 7 to August 29, 2009.
Djurgården became champions defeating Linköpings HC in the final.

Nordic Trophy

Standings

Game log

Final standings

Stats 

Players

Goalkeepers

Honours

Exhibition games

Game log

Regular season

Standings

Game log

Playoffs

Game log 

Legend: 

|}

Statistics 

from stats.swehockey

Skaters

Goaltenders

Transfers

Drafted players 
Djurgården players picked at the 2010 NHL Entry Draft.

References 

2009-10
2009–10 in Swedish ice hockey